Constancia Mangue Nsue Okomo (born 20 August 1952), also known as Constancia Mangue de Obiang, is the First Lady of Equatorial Guinea. She is the wife of President Teodoro Obiang Nguema Mbasogo and mother of First Vice President Teodoro Nguema Obiang Mangue.

References

1951 births
Living people
First ladies of Equatorial Guinea
Equatoguinean women in politics